Schreiter is a German surname. Notable people with the surname include:

Ida Schreiter (1912–1948), German labor department warden
Johannes Schreiter (b. 1930), German graphic artist
Katrin Schreiter (b. 1969), German sprinter

See also 
 Schreider

German-language surnames